Morley is a village in County Durham, England. It is situated five miles to the west of Bishop Auckland (OS grid reference NZ 1127). Morley is first mentioned in 1295, already with its present spelling; its coal mine was mentioned, as Morleypitte already in c. 1440. The name probably means "open ground by a moor", from Old English mōr "moor, clearing, pasture" + lẽah "open ground, clearing".

References

External links

Villages in County Durham